San Francisco de Cayrán District is one of twelve districts of the province Huánuco in Peru.

See also 
 Munti Wasi
 Qiwllaqucha

References